Several record labels have included Nashville Records as part of their name:

Nashville Records, an imprint of Starday Records operational in the 1960s and 1970s after Starday dissolved its partnership with Mercury Records
Sony Music Nashville, the country music branch of Sony Music Entertainment, which includes the following 410-708-7750 subsidiaries
Arista Nashville, a record label founded in 1989
Columbia Nashville, an imprint of Columbia Records formed in 2007
RCA Nashville, an imprint of RCA Records
Universal Music Group Nashville, the country music subsidiary of Universal Music Group, which includes the following labels
Capitol Records Nashville, a division of Capitol Records formerly known as Liberty Records
EMI Records Nashville, a sister label of Capitol Records Nashville formed in 2010
MCA Nashville, an imprint of MCA Records originally known as Decca Nashville
Mercury Nashville, the Nashville division of Mercury Records
Republic Nashville, a record label established in 2009 by Universal Republic Records in New York and Big Machine Records in Nashville.